The 2014–15 Turkish Women's Volleyball League is the 32nd edition of the top-flight professional women's volleyball league in Turkey.

Regular season

League table

Play-out

Playoffs

Classification group

Final group

Individual awards

References

External links 
Turkish Volleyball Federation official web page

2014 in Turkish women's sport
2015 in Turkish women's sport
Turkish Women's Volleyball League seasons